The Macra Terror is the completely missing seventh serial of the fourth season in the British science fiction television series Doctor Who, which was first broadcast in four weekly parts from 11 March to 1 April 1967.

In this serial, the Second Doctor (Patrick Troughton), Ben (Michael Craze), Polly (Anneke Wills) and Jamie (Frazer Hines) attempt to unravel a mystery within a human colony on an unnamed planet in the future, which leads to them becoming prisoners as opposed to guests. It also introduces the alien race known as the Macra. Although audio recordings, still photographs, and clips of the story exist, no episodes of this serial are known to have survived.

In March 2019, BBC Studios released an animated version of the serial using its surviving audio. It became the seventh incomplete Doctor Who serial to receive full-length animated reconstructions of its four missing episodes.

Plot
The Doctor, Ben, Polly and Jamie reach an unnamed planet in Earth's colonial future, concerned about seeing a claw from observing the TARDIS's time scanner. Upon landing, they subdue a half-crazed colonist named Medok, who is promptly arrested by Security Chief Ola. The travellers are escorted by Ola to a colony which refines a poison gas they are mining for unknown reasons. The Doctor is troubled by the colony's forced festivities, remaining unconvinced by the promises of the Colony's Pilot and the well wishes of the mysterious Controller who appears on a monitor as a still image to welcome the colony's guests. After Medok is paraded before the colonists as an example, he escapes from his cell when the Doctor visits him to learn about the creatures that he sees infesting the colony at night. The Doctor weasels out of being arrested and sentenced to labour in the mine since he and his friends captured Medok in the first place before slipping away to find Medok, learning more of the colony's infestation by giant insects and the fact that those who see them are then hospitalised and reconditioned. The night curfew begins and the other time-travellers retire to their rest quarters. The Doctor and Medok use the opportunity to investigate, and find the giant crab-like Macra roaming the colony.

The pair are soon captured and brought before the Pilot, but the Doctor is released when Medok claims the Doctor was convincing him to turn himself in. Later, the Pilot is told by the Controller to hypnotize their guests so that they can work in the mines. Jamie resists but Ben succumbs to the brainwashing, the Doctor arrested alongside Jamie when he disables the hypnosis equipment after snapping Polly out of her trance. Polly ends up encountering the Macra while running from Ben, with Ben momentarily freed from his conditioning long enough to save her and bring her to the Pilot's office where the Doctor and Jamie are. The Pilot is forced to request the Controller reveal his true face at the Doctor's insistence after being revealed to be hypnotised himself, with the group seeing an aged and terrified old man killed by the Macra: the Controller's true identity.

The briefly disturbed Pilot regains his composure and orders the immediate arrest of the Doctor's group, with the Doctor, Polly and Jamie sentenced to hard labour in the most treacherous part of the mine. Medok has also been sentenced to life there after his reconditioning failed, and warns them of the area's high mortality rate. The Doctor is left topside while the others venture into the deeper workings. Jamie and Medok escape, but the latter is seized by a Macra claw and dragged away to his death. Jamie comes face-to-face with a giant Macra, which seems to be sleeping until a burst of the deadly gas rejuvenates the creature. Other Macra soon appear and advance on Jamie.

The Doctor uses his guile to sow seeds of doubt regarding the truth of the planet in the minds of the colonists and of Ben, whose conditioning is weakening. The Doctor has worked out the gas flow seems to be the key to the situation and cleverly reverses it from the mine control area. Polly has reached the surface, and the Doctor calculates that he can buy Jamie time to escape from the mine as well. The improved oxygen flow weakens the Macra, enabling Jamie to escape.

The Doctor and Polly infiltrate the control area and find it overrun with Macra, the Doctor realizing the Macra need the gas to survive and have brainwashed the colonists into serving their needs. Ola demands that the travellers be punished for disobeying Control, but the Doctor persuades the Pilot to accompany him to the Control center. With their hold on the Pilot broken, the Macra give Ola full authority to place the Doctor, the Pilot, Polly and Jamie in an area of the mine where a mixture of combustible gasses will shortly explode. Ben, who has finally broken his conditioning, frees them, and some manipulation of the gas pipes sends the combustible mixture to the Control Centre. When the gas explodes, the Macra are all killed. The Doctor's group remain a bit longer as the members of the colony celebrate their freedom while declaring a holiday in their heroes' honour.

Production

 Episode is missing

Working titles for this story include The Spidermen, The Insect-Men and The Macras. This story introduced the first new opening title sequence since the series began. The new sequence was created by original titles designer Bernard Lodge and engineer Ben Palmer on 9 December 1966. For the first time, the face of the lead actor, Patrick Troughton, was incorporated into the "howl-around" patterns but the titles used the original theme music until Episode 1 of The Faceless Ones.

Anneke Wills wore a short wig for the majority of this serial, after Polly receives a makeover at the Colony.

Missing Episodes & Animation
All episodes of The Macra Terror are missing from the BBC archives. 38 seconds worth of footage survives from episode 2, mainly focusing on when Ben and Polly are attacked by the Macra. The controller's death at the end also survives, alongside the reprise of said death in episode 3. These clips only exist because they were cut by Australian censors and never returned to the BBC. Various brief clips on 8mm cine film recorded by an unknown fan in Australia survive from episode 3, mainly focusing on the Doctor and his companions. In February 2018, work began on an animated version of the serial, directed by Charles Norton and produced by BBC Studios. The production made use of animation facilities at Sun & Moon animation studio in Bristol. All character designs were drawn by lead artist Martin Geraghty. The bulk of the animation used Toon Boom Harmony's master controller. The animation first aired on BBC America on 26 December 2019.

Cast notes
Peter Jeffrey later played Count Grendel in The Androids of Tara (1978). Sandra Bryant had previously played Kitty in The War Machines (1966) and John Harvey played Professor Brett in the same serial. Gertan Klauber had previously appeared in The Romans (1965) and Graham Leaman would later appear in Fury from the Deep (1968) and again in The Three Doctors (1973).

After playing the part of Chicki in the first episode, Sandra Bryant asked to be released from her contract so that she could accept another job. Karol Keyes took over the part for the final episode.

Reception
Paul Cornell, Martin Day and Keith Topping summed up the story as "A flawed, but interesting examination, of a peculiarly 60s psychosis."

David J Howe and Stephen James Walker gave the serial a positive review although they thought that some of the more serious aspects of the story were "somewhat undermined by the presence of the Macra themselves, which tends to take it into traditional monster mayhem territory."  It was considered to be a good production with strong performances from the guest cast who were "all excellent, bringing to life some interesting and well-drawn characters."

The animated recreation of The Macra Terror was reviewed by Martin Belam of The Guardian, who felt that "the new animation makes the Macra far more evil scuttling creatures, and the story works all the better for it," but that the serial was overall "not one of Troughton’s best".

Commercial releases

In print

A novelisation of this serial, written by Ian Stuart Black, was published by Target Books in July 1987.

Home media
As with all missing episodes, off-air recordings of the soundtrack exist due to contemporary fan efforts. In 1992 these were released on audio cassette, accompanied by linking narration from the Sixth Doctor, Colin Baker. In 2000, the soundtrack was remastered and re-released on CD, again with the Baker narration. In November 2004, surviving clips were included in the Lost in Time DVD set. In 2012, the soundtrack was remastered and re-released on CD as part of the Lost TV Episodes Collection Four box set, this time with new narration by Anneke Wills.

The animated reconstruction of the serial was released by BBC Studios on TVoD, DVD and Blu-ray on 25 March 2019; all three formats contain Colour and Black and White versions, as well as a "bonus" abridged animation of The Wheel in Space: Episode 1. The DVD and Blu-ray also contain a tele-snap reconstruction, restored surviving footage and photos from the 1967 version, both the Baker and Wills narrated audio, footage of the Macra prop being built at Shawcraft Models, pre-production content from the animation and an audio commentary with the original cast. A Steelbook version of the Blu-ray contains the Tenth Doctor episode "Gridlock" on a bonus disc. The Macra Terror was animated in Toon Boom Harmony animation software.

References

Further reading

External links

The Macra Terror at Doctor Who Locations

Target novelisation

Second Doctor serials
Doctor Who missing episodes
Doctor Who serials novelised by Ian Stuart Black
1967 British television episodes